The red-legged salamander (Plethodon shermani) is a species of salamander in the family Plethodontidae. Formerly considered a subspecies of Plethodon jordani, it is native to the mountain forests of the southeastern United States.

Description
Red-legged salamanders tend to be somewhere between 85-185mm in length and are characterized by their slate-grey to bluish-black bodies and red coloration on their dorsal side of their legs. In the Unicoi Mountains it rarely has red coloration on the legs, but has lateral white spotting. Sexually active males have obvious, rounded mental glands. Young juveniles may have paired red spots running along the back. It is a terrestrial breeder.

Habitat

The red-legged salamanders make their habitats in cool, moderately humid forests in areas of high elevation, such as the Unicoi and Nantahala mountains as well as the southern Appalachians. While the species is mainly concentrated in North Carolina, they are also found in northern Georgia and southeast Tennessee. Due to being indigenous to less than five known regions, the species has been labeled as vulnerable to extinction. This species shelters under logs or rocks by day, and forages on the forest floor at night.

Diet
The red-legged salamander is a nocturnal forager that consumes a wide variety of small invertebrates found on the forest floor.

Conservation actions
Most of the range occurs in the Nantahala National Forest, where some clear cutting also occurs. Benefits of the species should come with the conservation actions being taken. The species does not appear to be on any state or federal list of endangered species.

Red-legged salamanders are relatively resilient to disturbances such as those associated with timbering operations, and are frequently found in second-growth forests and relatively small, fragmented woodlots.

References

AmphibiaWeb: Information on amphibian biology and conservation. [web application]. 2014. Berkeley, California: AmphibiaWeb. Available: http://amphibiaweb.org/. (Accessed: Oct 23, 2014).
Michael J. Lannoo. Amphibian Declines: The Conservation Status of United States Species. University of California Press, 2005 - Nature.  
Arnold, S. J. 1972. The evolution of courtship behavior in salamanders. Unpubl. Ph.D. diss., University of Michigan. Ann Arbor

Amphibians of the United States
Plethodon
Taxonomy articles created by Polbot
Amphibians described in 1906